Beatrice Moss Elvery, RHA (1883, Dublin – 1970, Rockall, Sandycove) was a painter, Irish stained-glass artist and sculptor.

Early life
Beatrice Moss Elvery was born in 1883, the second daughter of the Dublin businessman, William Elvery, whose family had originated from Spain where they were silk merchants. Her family owned the original Elverys Sports store in Wicklow Street, Dublin. Beatrice's mother, Theresa Moss, had attended the Dublin Metropolitan School of Art along with her sister, Annie Moss. Following in their mother's footsteps, Beatrice and her sister, Dorothy Elvery attended the Dublin Metropolitan School of Art (now the National College of Art and Design) where William Orpen (1878–1931) taught painting and later used Beatrice as a model.

Of his pupil, Orpen wrote that she had "many gifts, much temperament and great ability. Her only fault was that the transmission of her thoughts from her brain to paper or canvas, clay or stained glass became so easy to her that all was said in a few hours. Nothing on earth could make her go on and try to improve on her first translation of her thought." She remained a friend and correspondent of Orpen until shortly before his death in 1931. As a student at the Dublin Metropolitan School, Elvery won numerous prizes, including the Taylor Scholarship in 1901, 1902 and 1903. She is only one of three students to win the scholarship three years in succession.

Having been a working artist, Beatrice Elvery returned to the Dublin Metropolitan School of art to learn the art of making and painting leaded glass. Her teacher was Alfred Child. She was much influenced by Christopher Whall's book 'Stained glass work, a textbook for students and workers in glass.'

Career
When Sarah Purser founded her studio An Túr Gloine (The Tower of Glass) in 1903, she invited Beatrice Elvery to be one of the designers. Her first commission of six windows was installed in the Convent of Mercy chapel, Enniskillen, Co. Fermanagh in 1905. Christ among the Doctors, 1907, is at St Stephen's Church, Mount Street, Dublin; and St Nicholas's Church, Carrickfergus, a three-light, Good Samaritan; and The Prodigal Son. Some of her sketch designs in ink and watercolour are held in the National Gallery of Ireland.

Beatrice Elvery produced stained glass windows for St. Patrick's Cathedral Dublin, The Cathedral of the Annunciation and St. Nathy, Ballaghaderreen (St. John & St. Anne), St Canice's Cathedral Kilkenny, and some 20 other churches.
 
Elvery's paintings and book illustrations includeÉire (1907) which was a landmark painting modelled on a performance of Yeats' play 'Cathleen ni Houlihan' in which Maud Gonne played the title role. The painting promoted the idea of an independent Irish state. The painting was bought by Maud Gonne who presented it to Patrick Pearse.

She also produced numerous illustrations for children's books. Elvery was appointed an associate member of the Royal Hibernian Academy in 1932 and a full member in 1934. Her paintings were described by Albert Power as '...romantic, absurd, theatrical and exhilarating...'.

Elvery married Charles Campbell, 2nd Baron Glenavy in 1912 and they settled in London, returning to Ireland at the end of the war when she then concentrated on painting. She had three children Patrick, Bridget (known as Biddy) and Michael. While they were living in Ireland, the house was targeted by the Anti-treaty side in the Irish Civil War. Elvery objected to the burning of the house and insisted on the raiders allowing her to rescue the books. By the end of the process, Elvery was directing the burning party to remove first edition books, original paintings, furniture, and, because it was Christmas eve, the children's presents. Understandably She didn't want to repeat the Christmas shopping. Bridget was killed by a fire bomb in the 1972 bombing blitz.

In London, the circle in which they lived was frequented by literary and artistic personalities. The couple's literary circle included Yeats, George Bernard Shaw, D.H. Lawrence, Middleton Murry and Katherine Mansfield. The latter described Beatrice in one of her letters as 'a queer mixture for she is loving and affectionate, and yet she is malicious'. Her portrait of Mansfield in Elvery's garden is in the collection of the Museum of New Zealand Te Papa Tongarewa.

References

External links
 

1883 births
1970 deaths
20th-century Irish painters
20th-century Irish women artists
Artists from Dublin (city)
Alumni of the National College of Art and Design
Irish illustrators
Irish stained glass artists and manufacturers
Irish women painters
Glenavy